The 1140s BC is a decade which lasted from 1149 BC to 1140 BC.

Events and trends

Significant people
 Tiglath-Pileser I, king of Assyria, is born (approximate date).